Ararat Arakelyan (born on 1 February 1984 in the Armenia), is a retired Armenian International footballer who played as either a defender or midfielder.

Career

Club
On 20 July 2013, Arakelyan signed a one-year contract with Gandzasar Kapan.

International
Arakelyan was a member of the Armenia national team, and has participated in 33 international matches and scored 2 goals since his debut in away friendly match against Kuwait on 18 March 2005.

Personal life
Arakelyan is the older brother of Artashes Arakelyan.

Achievements
Banants Yerevan
 Armenian Cup: 2007

National team statistics

International goals

|}

References

External links

Profile at FFA

Living people
1984 births
Footballers from Yerevan
Armenian footballers
Armenian expatriate footballers
Armenia international footballers
FC Urartu players
FC Metalurh Donetsk players
Sanat Mes Kerman F.C. players
FC Alashkert players
Armenian Premier League players
Ukrainian Premier League players
Expatriate footballers in Ukraine
Armenian expatriate sportspeople in Ukraine
Expatriate footballers in Iran
Armenian expatriate sportspeople in Iran
Association football defenders